Rex Todhunter Stout (December 1, 1886 – October 27, 1975) was an American writer noted for his detective fiction. His best-known characters are the detective Nero Wolfe and his assistant Archie Goodwin, who were featured in 33 novels and 39 novellas between 1934 and 1975.

In 1959, Stout received the Mystery Writers of America's Grand Master Award. The Nero Wolfe corpus was nominated Best Mystery Series of the Century at Bouchercon XXXI, the world's largest mystery convention, and Rex Stout was nominated Best Mystery Writer of the Century.

In addition to writing fiction, Stout was a prominent public intellectual for decades. Stout was active in the early years of the American Civil Liberties Union and a founder of the Vanguard Press. He served as head of the Writers' War Board during World War II, became a radio celebrity through his numerous broadcasts, and was later active in promoting world federalism. He was the long-time president of the Authors Guild, during which he sought to benefit authors by lobbying for reform of the domestic and international copyright laws, and served a term as president of the Mystery Writers of America.

Biography

Early life
Stout was born in Noblesville, Indiana, in 1886, but shortly afterwards his Quaker parents John Wallace Stout and Lucetta Elizabeth Todhunter Stout moved their family (nine children in all) to Kansas.

His father was a teacher who encouraged his son to read, leading to Rex having read the entire Bible twice by the age of four. At age thirteen he was the state spelling bee champion. Stout attended Topeka High School, Kansas, and the University of Kansas, Lawrence. His sister, Ruth Stout, also authored several books on no-work gardening and some social commentaries.

He served in the U.S. Navy from 1906 to 1908 (including service as a yeoman on Theodore Roosevelt's presidential yacht) and then spent about the next four years working at a series of jobs in six states, including cigar-store clerk.

In 1910–11, Stout sold three short poems to the literary magazine The Smart Set. Between 1912 and 1918, he published about forty works of fiction in various magazines, ranging from literary publications such as Smith's Magazine and Lippincott's Monthly Magazine to pulp magazines like the All-Story Weekly.

Not his writing, but his invention of a school banking system in about 1916 gave him enough money to travel in Europe extensively. About 400 U.S. schools adopted his system for keeping track of the money that school children saved in accounts at school, and he was paid royalties.

In 1916, Stout married Fay Kennedy of Topeka, Kansas. They divorced in February 1932 and, in December 1932, Stout married Pola Weinbach Hoffmann, a designer who had studied with Josef Hoffmann in Vienna.

Writings
Rex Stout began his literary career in the 1910s writing for magazines, particularly pulp magazines, writing more than 40 stories that appeared between 1912 and 1918. Stout's early stories appeared most frequently in All-Story Magazine and its affiliates, but he was also published in Smith's Magazine, Lippincott's Monthly Magazine, Short Stories, The Smart Set, Young's Magazine, and Golfers' Magazine. The early stories spanned genres including romance, adventure, science fiction/fantasy, and detective fiction, including two serialized murder mystery novellas that prefigured elements of the Wolfe stories.

In 1916, Stout tired of writing a story whenever he needed money. He decided to stop writing until he had made enough money to support himself through other means, so that he would be able to write when and as he pleased. He wrote no fiction for more than a decade, until the late 1920s, when he had saved substantial money through his school banking system. Ironically, just as Stout was starting to write fiction again, he lost most of the money that he had made as a businessman in the Great Depression of 1929.

In 1929, Stout wrote his first published book How Like a God, an unusual psychological story written in the second person and published by the Vanguard Press, which he had helped to found. During this phase of his writing career, Stout also published a pioneering political thriller The President Vanishes (1934), which was originally published anonymously.

In the 1930s, Stout turned to writing detective fiction. In 1933–34, he wrote Fer-de-Lance, which introduced Nero Wolfe and his assistant Archie Goodwin. The novel was published by Farrar & Rinehart in October 1934, and in abridged form as "Point of Death" in The American Magazine (November 1934). The characters of Wolfe and Goodwin are considered among Stout's main contributions to detective fiction. Wolfe was described by reviewer Will Cuppy as "that Falstaff of detectives".

In 1937, Stout's novel The Hand in the Glove introduced the character of Theodolinda "Dol" Bonner, a female private detective who would appear in later Wolfe stories and who is an early and significant example of the woman PI as fictional protagonist. He also created two other detective protagonists, Tecumseh Fox and Alphabet Hicks. After 1938, Stout wrote no fiction but mysteries, and after 1940, almost entirely Nero Wolfe stories. Stout continued writing the Nero Wolfe series for the rest of his life, publishing at least one adventure per year through 1966 (with the exception of 1943, when he was busy with activities related to World War II). Stout's rate of production declined somewhat after 1966, but he still published four further Nero Wolfe novels prior to his death in 1975, at the age of 88.

During World War II, Stout cut back on his detective writing, joined the Fight for Freedom organization, and wrote propaganda. He hosted three weekly radio shows and coordinated the volunteer services of American writers to help the war effort. After the war, Stout returned to writing Nero Wolfe novels and took up the role of gentleman farmer on his estate at High Meadow in Brewster, north of New York City. He served as president of the Authors Guild and of the Mystery Writers of America, which in 1959 presented Stout with the Grand Master Award – the pinnacle of achievement in the mystery field.

Stout was a longtime friend of British humorist P. G. Wodehouse, writer of the Jeeves novels and short stories. Each was a fan of the other's work, and parallels are evident between their characters and techniques. Wodehouse contributed the foreword to Rex Stout: A Biography, John McAleer's Edgar Award-winning 1977 biography of the author (reissued in 2002 as Rex Stout: A Majesty's Life). Wodehouse also mentions Rex Stout in several of his Jeeves books, as both Bertie and his Aunt Dahlia are fans.

Public activities
In the fall of 1925, Roger Nash Baldwin appointed Rex Stout to the board of the American Civil Liberties Union's powerful National Council on Censorship; Stout served one term. Stout helped start the radical Marxist magazine The New Masses, which succeeded The Masses and The Liberator in 1926. He had been told that the magazine was primarily committed to bringing arts and letters to the masses, but he realized after a few issues "that it was Communist and intended to stay Communist", and he ended his association with it.

Stout was one of the officers and directors of the Vanguard Press, a publishing house established with a grant from the Garland Fund to reprint left-wing classics at an affordable cost and publish new books otherwise deemed "unpublishable" by the commercial press of the day. He served as Vanguard's first president from 1926 to 1928, and continued as vice president until at least 1931. During his tenure, Vanguard issued 150 titles, including seven books by Scott Nearing and three of Stout's own novels—How Like a God (1929), Seed on the Wind (1930), and Golden Remedy (1931).

In 1942, Stout described himself as a "pro-Labor, pro-New Deal, pro-Roosevelt left liberal".

During World War II, he worked with the advocacy group Friends of Democracy, chaired the Writers' War Board (a propaganda organization), and supported the embryonic United Nations. He lobbied for Franklin D. Roosevelt to accept a fourth term as president. He developed an extreme anti-German attitude and wrote the provocative essay "We Shall Hate, or We Shall Fail" which generated a flood of protests after its January 1943 publication in The New York Times. The attitude is expressed by Nero Wolfe in the 1942 novella "Not Quite Dead Enough".

On August 9, 1942, Stout conducted the first of 62 wartime broadcasts of Our Secret Weapon on CBS Radio. The idea for the counterpropaganda series had been that of Sue Taylor White, wife of Paul White, the first director of CBS News. Research was done under White's direction. "Hundreds of Axis propaganda broadcasts, beamed not merely to the Allied countries but to neutrals, were sifted weekly", wrote Stout's biographer John McAleer. "Rex himself, for an average of twenty hours a week, pored over the typewritten yellow sheets of accumulated data ... Then, using a dialogue format – Axis commentators making their assertions, and Rex Stout, the lie detective, offering his refutations – he dictated to his secretary the script of the fifteen-minute broadcast." By November 1942, Berlin Radio was reporting that "Rex Stout himself has cut his own production in detective stories from four to one a year and is devoting the entire balance of his time to writing official war propaganda." Newsweek described Stout as "stripping Axis short-wave propaganda down to the barest nonsensicals ... There's no doubt of its success."

During the later part of the war and the post-war period, he also led the Society for the Prevention of World War III which lobbied for a harsh peace for Germany. When the war ended, Stout became active in the United World Federalists.

House Committee on Un-American Activities chairman Martin Dies called him a Communist, and Stout is reputed to have said to him, "I hate Communists as much as you do, Martin, but there's one difference between us. I know what a Communist is and you don't."

Stout was one of many American writers closely watched by J. Edgar Hoover's FBI. Hoover considered him an enemy of the bureau and either a Communist or a tool of Communist-dominated groups. Stout's leadership of the Authors League of America during the McCarthy era was particularly irksome to the FBI. About a third of Stout's FBI file is devoted to his 1965 novel The Doorbell Rang.

In later years, Stout alienated some readers with his hawkish stance on the Vietnam War and with the contempt for communism expressed in certain of his works. The latter viewpoint is given voice in the 1952 novella "Home to Roost" (first published as "Nero Wolfe and the Communist Killer") and most notably in the 1949 novel, The Second Confession. In this work, Archie and Wolfe express their dislike for "Commies", while at the same time Wolfe arranges for the firing of a virulently anti-Communist broadcaster, likening him to "Hitler" and "Mussolini".

Reception and influence

Awards and recognition
 In his seminal 1941 work, Murder for Pleasure, crime fiction historian Howard Haycraft included the first two Nero Wolfe novels, Fer-de-Lance and The League of Frightened Men, in his list of the most influential works of mystery fiction.
 In 1958, Rex Stout became the 14th president of the Mystery Writers of America.
 In 1959, Stout received the MWA's prestigious Grand Master Award, which represents the pinnacle of achievement in the mystery field.
 In January 1969, the Crime Writers Association selected Stout as recipient of its Silver Dagger Award for The Father Hunt, which it named "the best crime novel by a non-British author in 1969."
 The Nero Wolfe corpus was nominated Best Mystery Series of the Century at the Bouchercon XXXI mystery convention, and Rex Stout was nominated Best Mystery Writer of the Century.
 In 2014, Rex Stout was selected to the New York State Writers Hall of Fame.

Cultural references
"A number of the paintings of René Magritte (1898–1967), the internationally famous Belgian painter, are named after titles of books by Rex Stout," wrote Harry Torczyner, Magritte's attorney and friend. "He read Hegel, Heidegger and Sartre, as well as Dashiell Hammett, Rex Stout and Georges Simenon," the Times Higher Education Supplement wrote of Magritte. "Some of his best titles were 'found' in this way." Magritte's 1942 painting Les compagnons de la peur ("The Companions of Fear") bears the title given to The League of Frightened Men (1935) when it was published in France by Gallimard (1939). It is one of Magritte's series of "leaf-bird" paintings, created during the Nazi occupation of Brussels. It depicts a stormy, mountainous landscape in which a cluster of plants has metamorphosed into a group of vigilant owls.

Stout is also mentioned in Ian Fleming's James Bond book On Her Majesty's Secret Service (1963).

Rex Stout Archive
The Rex Stout Archive anchors Boston College's collection of American detective fiction. The collection was donated by the Stout family and includes manuscripts, correspondence, legal papers, personal papers, publishing contracts, photographs, and ephemera. It also includes first editions, international editions, and archived reprints of Stout's books, as well as volumes from Stout's personal library, many of which found their way into Nero Wolfe's office. The comprehensive archive at Burns Library also includes the extensive personal collection of Stout's official biographer John McAleer, and the Rex Stout collection of bibliographer Judson C. Sapp.

Bibliography

Select radio credits

Select television credits

Notes

References

External links

 
 The Wolfe Pack, official site of the Nero Wolfe Society
 Merely a Genius..., Winnifred Louis' fan site dedicated to Nero Wolfe including a complete annotated bibliography
 Time obituary (November 10, 1975)
 John J. McAleer: The Making of Rex Stout's Biography (Mark Fullmer)
 Stout's radicalism, the FBI, the books (from the Daily Bleed Calendar)
 a comprehensive overview of Rex Stout's work and biography
 Forty years with Nero Wolfe (January 12, 2009) by Terry Teachout
 wiki collections of quotations from Rex Stout's works
 Ten Rex Stout stories (1913–1917) at The EServer (Iowa State University)
 
 
 
 Bibliography of Stout's first editions in the United Kingdom
 Wikiquote: Quote of the Day, December 1, 2013
 Rex Stout papers at John J. Burns Library, Boston College (PDF)

 
1886 births
1975 deaths
American mystery writers
American radio personalities
Nero Wolfe
People from Danbury, Connecticut
People from Noblesville, Indiana
Writers from Topeka, Kansas
University of Kansas alumni
Novelists from Indiana
Novelists from Connecticut
Edgar Award winners
20th-century American novelists
American male novelists
American detective fiction writers
20th-century American male writers
United States Navy sailors